Appelmans As appelman was a name for a fruit dealer, the surname could have an occupational origin. It may refer to:

 Gerard Appelmans, 13th-century mystic
 Jan Appelmans (1352–1411), Flemish architect
 Pieter Appelmans (1373–1434), Flemish architect, father of the above
 Sabine Appelmans (born 1972), Belgian tennis player

See also 
 Appelman

References 

Dutch-language surnames
Occupational surnames